Vasco Fernandes may refer to:
Grão Vasco (c.1475-c.1542), one of the main Portuguese  Renaissance painters.
Vasco Fernandes Coutinho, captain of Espírito Santo (1490–1561), the founder of the Brazilian state of Espírito Santo.
Vasco da Gama Fernandes (1908-1991), Portuguese lawyer and politician.
Vasco Fernandes (footballer) (1986-), Portuguese footballer